Babs or BABS may refer to:

People
 Nickname of Barbara Windsor (1937-2020), British actress
 Babs McMillan, Australian actress
 Babs Olusanmokun, American actor
 Babs Reingold, American artist
 Babs Fafunwa (1923-2010), Nigerian educationist, scholar and  Minister for Education, full name Aliu Babatunde Fafunwa
 Nickname of Barbra Streisand (born 1942), American singer and actress
 Nickname of Michael Keating (hurler) (born 1944), Irish retired hurling manager and player
 Babs Gonzales (1919-1980), American jazz singer, born Lee Brown
 Alice Babs (1924-2014), Swedish singer and actress, born Hildur Alice Nilson

In entertainment
 Babs (1920 film), a silent film starring Corinne Griffith
 Babs (2000 film), a 2000 Dutch film
 Babs (2017 film), a 2017 British film biopic of Dame Barbara Windsor
 Babs, a character in the animated film Chicken Run
 Babs, a character in the book "Just One Day" by Gayle Forman
 Babs Bunny from Tiny Toon Adventures
Babs Pewterschmidt, a character in Family Guy
 Babs Seed, a minor recurring character in My Little Pony: Friendship is Magic
 Babs Woods, a character in the UK soap opera Family Affairs
 Babs Byuteman, a character in the Netflix television show Pinky Malinky
 Babs Johnson, the lead character in the 1972 John Waters film Pink Flamingos

BABS
 Bay Area Bike Share
 Beam Approach Beacon System
 Bradburn Affect Balance Scale
 British Association of Barbershop Singers
 Build America Bonds, a type of municipal bond
 Three Seas Initiative, also known as the Baltic–Adriatic–Black Sea (BABS) Initiative, an intergovernmental cooperation in Central Europe

Other uses
 Typhoon Babs
 Allied code name for the Japanese Mitsubishi Ki-15 World War II aircraft
 Babs (land speed record car), built and driven by John Parry-Thomas in 1926

See also
 Bab (disambiguation)
 BAB (disambiguation)
 Barbara Graham (1923-1955), American murderer nicknamed "Bloody Babs" by the press

Lists of people by nickname